is a railway station in the city of  Itoigawa, Niigata, Japan, operated by Echigo Tokimeki Railway.

Lines

Station layout
The station consists of one side platform and one island platform, of which only one side is in use. The station is unattended.

Platforms

Adjacent stations

History
The station opened on 16 December 1912, as part of the Japanese Government Railways (JGR, JNR after 1949). From this date, Kajiyashiki Station was transferred to the ownership of the third-sector operating company Echigo Tokimeki Railway.

Passenger statistics
In fiscal 2017, the station was used by an average of 49 passengers daily (boarding passengers only).

Surrounding area
Kajiyashiki Post Office

Itoigawa Higashi Junior School

See also
 List of railway stations in Japan

References

External links
Train timetables 

Railway stations in Niigata Prefecture
Railway stations in Japan opened in 1912
Stations of Echigo Tokimeki Railway
Itoigawa, Niigata